Black Dwarf Cave is a cave and tourist attraction in Tianfu Village on Liuqiu Island, off Pingtung County, Taiwan. Its scenic area includes paths around the surrounding coasts and its ticket includes access to some other nearby attractions such as Mountain Pig Ditch and Beauty Cave.

Name
The Chinese name of the cave does not involve dwarves but devils, ghosts, or spirits. Carved on the entrance of the cave is this story: 

The township website reports that black slaves "abandoned the Dutch" and "were found" in the cave, but doesn't credit their discovery to aggrieved British. Instead, it says that the local Taiwanese and Filipino fishermen and traders often anchored in Geban Bay and the slaves became pirates who would cut holes in the bottoms of the boats by night and then raid their wrecks. At some point, crews who had experienced this before investigated the area, discovered the cave, and massacred the pirates with a large fire.

Both legends were later fabrications. The actual "Negroes" were the members of the local Siraya tribe, who were slaughtered by the Dutch in the old cave during the Liuqiu Island Massacre.

History
At some point after the Qing Dynasty, the roof of the cave's entrance and main cavern collapsed. It wasn't reopened until 1975, when the township government turned it into a tourist attraction.

Geology
The cave is a solutional cave. The main entrance of the cave has collapsed leaving only one narrow passage, which is long, narrow, dark, and very damp.

See also
 Geology of Taiwan
 Beauty & Lobster Caves

References

Caves of Taiwan
Landforms of Pingtung County